World in Motion is the ninth album by American singer-songwriter Jackson Browne, released in 1989 (see 1989 in music). It peaked at number 45 on The Billboard 200 and was Browne's first album to obtain neither gold nor platinum status. The album took three years to complete and makes statements about nuclear disarmament and the "secret" government that brought forth Oliver North and the Iran-Contra scandal.

Reception

The critical reviews of World in Motion were lukewarm. Music critic William Rulhmann wrote "Except for the gloomy viewpoint, it was hard to recognize the Jackson Browne of his first few albums amid all the commentary, and even if you agreed with his overall political stance, that was disappointing." Critic Robert Christgau commented that the best songs were the ones Browne did not write. Rolling Stone wrote, "Steven Van Zandt's 'I Am a Patriot' is the only truly memorable song on Browne's trilogy of protest albums."

Cash Box said of the title track that "Hackneyed late-’80s production (by Scott Thurston and the artist) and a way too literal political lyric ('Sun going down on the USA,' it starts out) make this AOR emphasis track a struggle to sit through, despite the warming presence of Bonnie Raitt."

Track listing
All tracks composed by Browne except where noted:
"World in Motion" (Browne, Craig Doerge) – 4:24
"Enough of the Night" – 4:54
"Chasing You into the Light" – 4:16
"How Long" – 6:10
"Anything Can Happen" – 5:05
"When the Stone Begins to Turn" – 4:48
"The Word Justice" (Browne, Scott Thurston) – 4:18
"My Personal Revenge" (Tomás Borge, Luis Enrique Mejía Godoy, translation by Jorge Calderón) – 4:02
"I Am a Patriot" (Steven Van Zandt) – 4:02
"Lights and Virtues" – 4:53

Personnel 
 Jackson Browne – lead vocals, slide guitar (1), resonator guitar (1), acoustic piano (2, 5, 7), baritone guitar (3, 10), keyboards (4), drum programming (4)
 Craig Doerge – keyboards (1, 4)
 Ray Lema – keyboards (6), harmony vocals (6)
 Doug Haywood – harmony vocals (1, 6, 9), keyboards (7), organ (9)
 Kevin Dukes – guitar (1, 2, 5–7, 9, 10), acoustic guitar (3, 8), electric guitar (8) 
 David Lindley – lap steel guitar (4)
 Yves N'Djock – guitar (6)
 Jorge Strunz – acoustic gut-string guitar (8)
 Hugo Pedroza – charango (8), tiple (8)
 Scott Thurston – bass (1, 7, 10), harmony vocals (1, 2, 6, 7, 9), keyboards (2–8, 10), guitar (5), guitar solo (8)
 Bob Glaub – bass (2–4, 8, 9), guitar (7) 
 Robbie Shakespeare – bass (6)
 Michael Jochum – drums (1–3, 7–10), tom tom (6)
 Russ Kunkel – drums (4), drum programming (5)
 Walfredo Reyes, Jr. – drums (5)
 Sly Dunbar – drums (6)
 Alex Acuña – percussion (2, 5)
 Brice Wouassy – percussion (6)
 Bonnie Raitt – harmony vocals (1)
 Lori B. Williams – harmony vocals (1, 2, 6, 9)
 Djene Doumbouya – harmony vocals (6)
 Brinsley Forde – harmony vocals (6)
 Tony Gad – harmony vocals (6)
 Drummie Zeb – harmony vocals (6)
 Salif Keita – Malian vocals (6)
 David Crosby – harmony vocals (7)

Production 
 Producers – Jackson Browne and Scott Thurston
 Production Assistant – Bill Irvin
 Engineers – James Geddes (Tracks 1–5 & 7–10); Paul Smykle (Track 6).
 Additional Engineers – Terry Becker, Jim Nipar and David Tickle (Tracks 1–5 & 7–10); Phillippe Boisse and Roy Hendrickson (Track 6).
 Assistant Engineers – Scott Blockland (Tracks 1–5 & 7–10); Ingmar Kiang (Track 6).
 Recorded at Groove Masters (Santa Monica, CA); The Power Station (New York, NY); Island Studios (London, England); Studio Devout (Paris, France).
 Mixed by David Tickle at Groove Masters
 Mastered by Doug Sax at The Mastering Lab (Los Angeles, CA).
 Technical Engineer – Ed Wong
 Art Direction and Design – Dawn Patrol and Jimmy Wachtel
 Photography – Annie Leibovitz
 Paintings – Francisco Letelier
 Management – Donald Miller
 Management Staff – Veronica Albano, Ty Braswell, Mike Sexton, Lisa Van Valkenburgh and Randall Wixen.

Charts
Album – Billboard (United States)

Singles – Billboard (United States)

References 

Jackson Browne albums
1989 albums
Elektra Records albums
Albums with cover art by Jimmy Wachtel
Political music albums by American artists